Hello Land! is the fourth album by multinational music group Guillemots. On 7 May 2012, the band announced their intention to release four albums during the year, each representing a different season – the first, Hello Land!, was released through The state51 Conspiracy, and represents spring. The album was primarily recorded in Norway.

Track listing

External links
 Official site
 The state51 Conspiracy

References

Guillemots (band) albums
2012 albums
Baroque pop albums